Chris Jackson may refer to:

Sports
 Chris Jackson (wide receiver) (born 1975), American football coach and former American, Arena, and Canadian football player
 Chris Jackson (defensive back) (born 1998), American football defensive back
 Chris Jackson (New Zealand footballer) (born 1970)
 Chris Jackson (Scottish footballer) (born 1973)
 Christopher Jackson (footballer) (born 1996), Liberian footballer
 Chris Jackson or Mahmoud Abdul-Rauf (born 1969), American professional basketball player

Other
 Christopher Jackson (politician) (born 1935), British politician and businessman
 Christopher Jackson (musician) (1948–2015), Canadian organist, harpsichordist, and choral conductor
 Christopher Jackson (actor) (born 1975), American actor and singer
 Christopher Jackson (geologist) (born 1977), British geologist
 Chris Jackson (publisher), American publisher